Lee F. Satterfield (born December 17, 1958) is a Senior Judge on the Superior Court of the District of Columbia.

Education and career 
Satterfield earned his Bachelor of Arts in Economics from University of Maryland in 1980 and his Juris Doctor from George Washington University Law School in 1983.

After graduating, he served as a law clerk for D.C. Superior Court judge Paul R. Webber, III.

Since 1991, Satterfield taught Criminal Trial Practice and Advanced Criminal Procedure at the Catholic University Columbus School of Law as an adjunct professor for over twenty years.

D.C. Superior Court 
President George H. W. Bush nominated Satterfield on June 19, 1992, to a 15-year term as an associate judge on the Superior Court of the District of Columbia to the seat vacated by Robert McCance Scott. On September 30, 1992, the Senate Committee on Homeland Security and Governmental Affairs held a hearing on his nomination. On October 2, 1992, the committee reported his nomination favorably to the Senate floor. On October 8, 1992, the full Senate confirmed his nomination by voice vote.

In 2008, Satterfield was appointed to a four-year term as chief judge on the D.C. Superior Court. On July 26, 2012, he was reappointed to a second four year term as chief judge. In 2016, he requested to be appointed to a third term but the Judicial Nomination Commission chose Robert E. Morin as chief judge.

Personal life 
Satterfield has been a lifelong resident of Washington D.C.

References

1958 births
Living people
20th-century American judges
21st-century American judges
African-American judges
Columbus School of Law faculty
George Washington University Law School alumni
Judges of the Superior Court of the District of Columbia
Lawyers from Washington, D.C.
University System of Maryland alumni